Tricia Striano Skoler is the Head of the Independent Research Group on Cultural Ontogeny at the Max Planck Institute for Evolutionary Anthropology in Leipzig, Germany.

Career 
Striano was born in Weymouth Massachusetts.  She obtained her BA in psychology from The College of the Holy Cross. She obtained her Ph.D. in psychology from Emory University in 2000, after which she became Head of the Independent Research Group on Cultural Ontogeny at the Max Planck Institute for Evolutionary Anthropology in Leipzig, Germany. In 2004,

Tricia Striano received the Sofia Kovalevskaya Award of the Alexander von Humboldt Foundation. She built the Neurocognition and Development Research Group at the Max Planck Institute for Human Cognitive and Brain Sciences and Center for Advanced Studies at the University of Leipzig.

In 2008, Striano obtained her habilitation from the University of Osnabruck in Germany. Striano is a Full Professor in the Department of Psychology at Hunter College, City University of New York. Tricia Striano founded Tricia Striano Inc and brands AisforBanana® and ZWIFLY®.

Research 
Striano's main area of research is social cognition and learning in infancy, using brain and behavioral measures.

Publications

Articles

Books

References

External links 
Official Site 
 

American women psychologists
21st-century American psychologists
Developmental psychologists
College of the Holy Cross alumni
Emory University alumni
Hunter College faculty
1973 births
Living people
21st-century American women